A. A. Manavalan (1937–2018) was a Tamil language Indian scholar. He was awarded Saraswati Samman (2011) for his work Irama Kathaiyum Iramayakalyum (2005), which is a comparative study of Ramayana written in 48 languages including Sanskrit, Pali, Prakrit, Tibetan, Tamil, Old Javanese, Japanese, Telugu, Assamese, Malayalam, Bengali, Kannada, Marathi, Hindi, Odisi, Persian, Malay, Burmese, Maranao, Thai, Laotian and Kashmiri. He was the second person from Tamil Nadu to receive this honour, first was Indira Parthasarathy

He earned PhD degree in English literature for his doctoral dissertation Epic Heroism in Milton and Kamban. He translated Poetics of Aristotle into Tamil, a first of its kind in any Indian languages.

Manavalan died on 1 December 2018.

Works
Selected works by A. A. Manavalan:

 Tamil research through journals : an annotated bibliography
 Dr. Mu. Va. : collection of research papers on Dr. Mu. Va.
 Mutual flames : essays in comparative literature, Tamil and English
 Epic heroism in Milton and Kamban
 A compendium of Tirukkural : translations in English
 Essays and tributes on Tirukkural : 1886-1986 A.D.
 Comparative studies in literary cultures
 Aristotilin Kavithai Iyal (Aristotle's poetics in Tamil)

References

Tamil-language writers
Recipients of the Saraswati Samman Award
1937 births
2018 deaths